Exile in Guyville is the debut studio album by American singer-songwriter Liz Phair, released on June 22, 1993, by Matador Records. It was recorded at Idful Music Corporation in Chicago between 1992 and 1993 and produced by Phair and Brad Wood. The album received critical acclaim and in 2020, it was ranked  56 by Rolling Stone in its 500 Greatest Albums of All Time list. It was certified gold in 1998 and as of July 2010 it had sold 491,000 copies.

Background
In the summer of 1991, Phair wrote and recorded songs on audio cassette tapes, which she circulated in Chicago using the moniker Girly-Sound. Initially, she sent out only two tapes, one to Tae Won Yu from the band Kicking Giant, and the other to Chris Brokaw. The recipients of the Girly-Sound tapes circulated copies with other early fans.

John Henderson, owner of the Chicago indie label Feel Good All Over, heard the tapes and contacted Phair. Soon she moved into his apartment and started playing her songs to him. Henderson brought in producer Brad Wood to help develop the 4-track demos into full songs. Originally, Phair's recordings were supposed to come out on Henderson's label. However, the whole process was made difficult by the fact that he and Phair had opposite ideas regarding what direction to take in terms of sound. Henderson preferred a stripped-down but precise sound, possibly with outside musicians, while Phair wanted a fuller sound. Phair has stated, "We both wanted something for me. He was projecting onto me what he wanted my music to come out like, which was wrong. So I blew him off." Eventually, Henderson stopped showing up at the studio, which made Phair move out of his apartment and start working exclusively with Brad Wood on what would become Exile in Guyville.

Eventually, a Girly-Sound tape had made it to the head of Matador Records. Despite the outcome of the recording sessions, Henderson tipped off Brad Wood that Matador was interested in Phair. When Matador was contacted by Phair in 1992, they signed her. Gerard Cosloy, co-president of Matador, stated that "We usually don't sign people we haven't met, or heard other records by, or seen as performers. But I had a hunch, and I called her back and said okay."

Recording

After the early sessions with John Henderson, Liz Phair started working with producer Brad Wood at Idful Studios, in 1992. Wood stated, "We did two or three evenings of recording just for fun where we tried to discover something. We recorded "Fuck and Run," and that's when I realized we were on to something. This really spare beat: just guitar, drums and vocals. It was right: simple, driving, direct and blunt. It had so much exuberance." These sessions were thereby very different from the recording sessions with John Henderson. Eventually, engineer Casey Rice joined Idful and started working with Phair and Wood as she had no band of her own.

Initially, there were many time constraints because Phair had moved into her parents' house which was far from the studio, and Wood had to manage his time between his work at the studio and his work as a janitor. However, when Phair signed to Matador, she sublet an apartment close to the studio, which simplified the process.

Regarding the recording process, Casey Rice stated, "We basically all sat around and thought about how to make the guitar and vocals versions of the songs into what we thought would be better ones. Listen to her four-track versions of the tunes, and try to come up with ways of doing them as a 'band'. I do recall there being no lack of candor and if someone wanted to do something, we tried it. If it sucked, no one would hesitate to say so if they believed it."

Brad Wood provided a different recording approach, structuring the drum patterns and bass lines around Phair's vocal phrases and guitar riffs, instead of recording the rhythm section first and then layering the guitars and vocals on top. Phair has commented, "It was fun. Actually we just played our parts separately. I laid down the guitar, and then I would just tell them what kind of song it would be and what kinds of instruments we needed to do. And then they would go in there and figure out a part and then do it. It was more like collage work than really playing with a band."

"Johnny Sunshine" was one of the first songs recorded in 1992 that eventually made the record. The songs "Fuck and Run", "Never Said" (as "Clean"), "Girls! Girls! Girls!", "Flower", "Johnny Sunshine", "Divorce Song", "Soap Star Joe", "Shatter", and "Stratford-on-Guy" (as "Bomb") all originated from a set of home recordings by Phair under the moniker Girly-Sound, and were re-recorded for the album.

Packaging
Phair was also responsible for a great part of the artwork design. Originally, the album cover was largely collage based and involved "a fat lady in a pool". In 2008, Phair stated it was originally "an orgy of Barbies floating in a pool", a concept that Matador rejected, stating that such artwork would not sell. The final cover design is a photo of Liz topless in a photo booth, taken and cropped by Nash Kato of Urge Overkill. The interior artwork is based on that of Lopez Tejera's 1952 album The Joys and Sorrows of Andalusia. The booklet also features a collage of several Polaroid photos of Phair, Wood, Rice (and various other people), with a paraphrase from lines from the movie Dirty Harry.

Meaning
The term Guyville comes from a song of the same name by Urge Overkill. Liz Phair explained the concept of the album in a Billboard article, stating that "For me, Guyville is a concept that combines the smalltown mentality of a 500-person Knawbone, KY.-type town with the Wicker Park indie music scene in Chicago, plus the isolation of every place I've lived in, from Cincinnati to Winnetka". When asked during an interview with Noah Adams on his radio show All Things Considered about the concept, she elaborated: "It was a state of mind and / or neighborhood that I was living in. Guyville, because it was definitely their sensibilities that held the aesthetic, you know what I mean? It was sort of guy things - comic books with really disfigured, screwed-up people in them, this sort of like constant love of social aberration. You know what I mean? This kind of guy mentality, you know, where men are men and women are learning." Asked about what she sees in Guyville, Phair said that "All the guys have short, cropped hair, John Lennon glasses, flannel shirts, unpretentiously worn, not as a grunge statement. Work boots."

Phair has also stated that most songs on the album were not about her. She commented, "That stuff didn't happen to me, and that's what made writing it interesting. I wasn't connecting with my friends. I wasn't connecting with relationships. I was in love with people who couldn't care less about me. I was yearning to be part of a scene. I was in a posing kind of mode, yearning to have things happen for me that weren't happening. So I wanted to make it seem real and convincing. I wrote the whole album for a couple people to see and know me."

Phair commented in interviews that the album was a song-by-song reply to the Rolling Stones' 1972 album Exile on Main St. Some critics contend that the album is not a clear or obvious song-by-song response, although Phair sequenced her compositions in an attempt to match the songlist and pacing of the Rolling Stones album.

Reception

Exile in Guyville received critical acclaim. It was the No. 1 album in the year-end critics poll in Spin and the Village Voice Pazz & Jop critics poll.

It was also a moderate commercial success. The videos for "Never Said" and "Stratford-On-Guy" received airplay on MTV. By the spring of 1994, it had sold over 200,000 units, peaking at No. 196 on the Billboard 200 and was Matador's most successful release at the time. In 1998, it was certified gold by the RIAA.

Phair reacted to the reception of Guyville, saying "I don't really get what happened with Guyville. It was so normal, from my side of things. It was nothing remarkable, other than the fact that I'd completed a big project, but I'd done that before... Being emotionally forthright was the most radical thing I did. And that was taken to mean something bigger in terms of women's roles in society and women's roles in music... I just wanted people who thought I was not worth talking to, to listen to me." The sudden success of the album also generated a somewhat negative response from Chicago's indie music scene. Phair commented, "It's odd... Guyville was such a part of indie. But at the same time... I was kind of at war with indie when I made that record." Another problem that arose from her success was also dealing with her stage fright.

Despite this, the album inspired a number of imitators, and the lo-fi sound and emotional honesty of Phair's lyrics were frequently cited by critics as outstanding qualities. It frequently appears on many critics' best-of lists. It was ranked 15 in Spins "100 Greatest Albums, 1985–2005". VH1 named Exile in Guyville the 96th Greatest Album Of All-Time. The album was ranked number 56 on Rolling Stones 2020 reboot of their The 500 Greatest Albums of All Time list (it was ranked number 328 in the original 2003 list and number 327 in the 2012 revision). In 1999, Pitchfork rated Exile in Guyville as the fifth best album of the 1990s. However, in its 2003 revision of the list, it moved to No. 30. Robert Christgau named it among his 10 best albums from the 1990s.

In 2013, The New Yorkers Bill Wyman dubbed it "patently one of the strongest rock albums ever made", feeling that each song "reverberates powerfully". He described it as "arguably the quintessential example" of indie rock. PopMatters David Chiu wrote that Exile lay bedroom pop music's groundwork. He noted that several indie bands and musicians had gained their "musical DNA" from the record, such as Frankie Cosmos, Jay Som, and more.

Accolades

Reissues

15th Anniversary Edition (2008) 
In 2008, Phair signed to ATO Records and released a 15th-anniversary reissue of Exile in Guyville on June 14. It includes three previously unreleased tracks ("Ant in Alaska", a cover of Lynn Taitt's "Say You" and an instrumental listed on the disc as "Standing") and a DVD documentary.

Girly-Sound to Guyville (2018) 
On May 4, 2018, Matador reissued Exile in Guyville for its 25th anniversary. The reissue consists of the original album remastered and Phair's three Girly-Sound demo tapes, marking the first time that the full set of demo tapes had been officially released. The reissue was released in four formats: the physical LP box set, the digital deluxe edition, as well as cassette and CD pressings. Absent from the reissue are the two Girly-Sound demos "Shatter" and "Fuck or Die", as Phair was unable to get clearance for samples used in the songs.

Track listing

Personnel
As per the liner notes of the 2008 reissue:

Liz Phair – guitar, piano , vocals, hand claps 
Casey Rice – lead guitar , cymbal , background vocals, hand clapping 
Brad Wood – bass and drums , organ , synthesizer, percussion, bongos , tambourine and shaker , maracas and hand claps , background vocals, vocals , drones and feedback , "sick guitar" , guitar 
Tony Marlotti – bass , vocals 
John Casey – harmonica 
Tutti Jackson – backing vocals

Charts

Certifications

Release history

References

External links
Exile in Guyville: The Oral History
Liz Phair Reissues Exile in Guyville, Signs to ATO
October 6, 2008 NPR Live Performance in Los Angeles of 'Exile in Guyville'

Liz Phair albums
1993 debut albums
Matador Records albums
Albums produced by Brad Wood